Haber syndrome is a cutaneous disorder of hyperpigmentation characterized by reticulated pigmentation of the person's skin. A rare genodermatosis, its key features include "rosacea-like facial eruption[,] reticulated hyperpigmentation of major flexures, comedones on the back and neck, and pitted facial scars."

See also
 List of cutaneous conditions

References

External links 

Disturbances of human pigmentation
Genodermatoses
Syndromes affecting the skin